SuEllen Fried is an American bullying prevention activist, writer and educator. She was number 900 on President George H. W. Bush's Thousand Points of Light foundation list in 1993.

Early life and education
Born SuEllen Weissman on September 18, 1932 in St. Louis, Missouri.

She graduated from University City High School in University City, Missouri in 1950. She studied at Washington University in St. Louis, where she was a member of Sigma Delta Tau. She earned a B.A. from Park University, in Parkville, Missouri in 1975 and an M.A. equivalency from the American Dance Therapy Association in 1996.

Career
Fried was a member of the Dance Ensemble of the St. Louis Municipal Opera from 1949 through 1951. She also appeared in a party scene in Kansas City native Robert Altman's 1957 film The Delinquents.

Fried worked as a dance therapist for twenty years, and from 1961 to 1978, Fried was a volunteer dance and drama therapist at Osawatomie State Hospital in Kansas. In 1970 was appointed to President Richard Nixon's Task Force on the Mentally Handicapped. She was a consultant to the National Institute of Mental Health as well as the Center for Advanced Study and Continuing Education in Mental Health.

Fried's work with Dr. Karl Menninger led her to found STOP Violence in 1982, an organization that developed a program called Reaching Out From Within. This monthly program trained volunteers to teach prison inmates to change their violent language, actions and thoughts. As of 2004, it ran ten programs in seven Kansas Correctional facilities.

The program has been effective, recording much lower recidivism rates among program participants than non-participating inmates. From a Huffington Post profile of Fried and Reaching Out From Within:—

Abuse prevention work
Fried draws upon her dance therapy experience in her abuse prevention program, helping teach body awareness and how to adjust to others.

Fried's seven "prevention principles" were defined in her book Bullies and Victims, and given the acronym SCRAPES:

 Self-esteem and skill enrichment
 Conflict resolution and mediation skills
 Respect for differences
 Anger management and assertiveness training
 Problem solving skills
 Empathy training
 Sexuality awareness training.

Her books are intended for parents of children who have been bullied as well as those whose children may be bullies. She and her co-authors attempt to offer practical suggestions for minimizing peer abuse, to teach about the harm caused by gossip and name-calling and to prevent an escalation to violence.

In 2002, Fried founded BullySafeUSA, which has enabled her to work with more than 90,000 students, educators, councilors, administrators and parents in 36 states 
Additionally, she and her organization are working to help reduce cyber-bullying on social networking sites and web pages.

Books
 Bullies & Victims: Helping Your Children Through the Schoolyard Battlefield - 1996 (co-author Paula Fried, Ph. D)  
 Bullies, Targets, and Witnesses: Helping Children Break the Pain Chain - 2004 (co-author Paula Fried, Ph. D) 
 Banishing Bullying Behavior: Transforming the Culture of Pain, Rage and Revenge - 2009 (co-author Blanche Sosland, Ph. D) 
 Banishing Bullying Behavior: Transforming the Culture of Peer Abuse - 2011 (revised second edition) (co-author Blanche Sosland, Ph. D) 
 30 Activities for Getting Better At Getting Along - 2011 (co-author Lynne Lang)

References

1932 births
Living people
Anti-bullying activists
American social psychologists
20th-century American non-fiction writers
21st-century American non-fiction writers
20th-century American women writers
21st-century American women writers
Washington University in St. Louis alumni
Park University alumni